Xingkong, is a military camouflage pattern adopted in 2019 by all branches of the People's Liberation Army (PLA) of the People's Republic of China (PRC). Introduced in 2019, the Xingkong pattern replaced the Type 07 camouflage on the Type 07 service uniforms used by regular units. The new uniform and Xingkong camouflage were first seen in late September 2019 before the celebration ceremony for the 70th anniversary of the People's Republic of China. 

The Xingkong camouflage is deployed with Type 19 and Type 21 uniform series.

History

Design
The new uniform is available with five different camouflage patterns and colors are no longer service-based. The uniform design incorporates fastening hoop for wrist, elbow, ankle and knee, which prevents a soldier wearing the uniform being affected by vegetation or terrain during travel. The uniform also features internal slots for elbow and knee pads. The pocket on the uniform is designed to open sideways, making it convenient to use after equipping tactical vest.

Customization for accessories is achieved with the new design. Urban, woodland and jungle camouflage is fitted with black-colored gloves and boots, while desert and tundra has sand colored ones.

The new pattern offers better concealment in variable distances comparing to traditional digital camouflage, due to the utilizing of unrecognizable tiny digital grids. It has dots or stars in the fabric that are smaller than that of Type 07 digital camouflage.

Fielding
According to Senior Colonel Wu Qian, Director General of the Information Office of the Chinese Ministry of National Defense, the camo's distribution to the entire PLA is going as scheduled in an October 31, 2019 announcement.

The Xingkong is expected to be distributed with helmets, tactical gloves, combat vests and military boots.

Variants 
Five variants of pattern for Xingkong camouflage is available.
Woodland Brown and green colored digital camouflage.
Jungle Jungle green colored digital camouflage.
Desert Light sand colored digital camouflage. 
Arid also called Wasteland and Tundra by some sources. Dark sand colored digital camouflage.
Urban Dark grey colored digital camouflage.

Gallery

References

Camouflage patterns
Military camouflage
Military equipment of the People's Republic of China
Military uniforms
People's Liberation Army
Military equipment introduced in the 2010s